UFC 199: Rockhold vs. Bisping 2 was a mixed martial arts event held on June 4, 2016, at The Forum in Inglewood, California.

Background
While this was the first time the organization has held an event at the venue, it was the fifth time that UFC has hosted an event in Los Angeles County. Previous UFC events in the area took place at the Staples Center.

The event was expected to be headlined by a UFC Middleweight Championship rematch between champion Luke Rockhold and former champion Chris Weidman. They previously met at UFC 194, when Rockhold won Weidman's title via fourth-round TKO. However, Weidman pulled out on May 17 due to a large extrusion herniation on his neck. The first replacement choice was former Strikeforce Middleweight Champion Ronaldo Souza, who lost his title to Rockhold in 2011, but he injured his meniscus in a win at UFC 198 against former UFC Light Heavyweight Champion Vitor Belfort. Therefore, he was replaced by The Ultimate Fighter 3 winner Michael Bisping. The fight was also a rematch as the two met previously in November 2014 at UFC Fight Night: Rockhold vs. Bisping, with Rockhold winning via submission in the second round.

The co-main event featured a UFC Bantamweight Championship trilogy bout between current two-time champion Dominick Cruz and former WEC Featherweight Champion Urijah Faber. The pairing first met at featherweight on WEC 26 in 2007, where Faber defeated Cruz via guillotine choke to defend his title. The rematch took place on UFC 132 in 2011, when Cruz defended his title for the first time via unanimous decision.

A lightweight bout between Evan Dunham and The Ultimate Fighter: Brazil 2 winner Leonardo Santos, originally scheduled for UFC 198, was moved to this event after a minor injury to Dunham delayed the matchup a few weeks. Subsequently, Santos pulled out on April 29 due to an undisclosed injury and was replaced by James Vick. In turn, Dunham pulled out of that pairing on May 5 for undisclosed reasons and was replaced by Beneil Dariush.

In January 2016, former UFC Lightweight and Welterweight Champion B.J. Penn announced his intention to return to active competition in the featherweight division after an 18-month "retirement" and was expected to compete at UFC 197. However, Penn's return was delayed after an investigation into criminal allegations made against him was launched. After the UFC concluded that no criminal or civil charges would be filed, the organization announced that he would face Dennis Siver at this event. In turn, Siver pulled out on May 10 due to an undisclosed injury. He was replaced by Cole Miller. Subsequently, Penn himself was removed from the card on May 23 after he was flagged for a potential anti-doping violation: the use of an IV in excess of 50 ml in a six-hour period during a March 25 out-of-competition sample collection. He was replaced by Alex Caceres.

A lightweight bout between John Makdessi and Mehdi Baghdad was originally scheduled for this event, but on April 28 it was announced that the bout was moved to UFC Fight Night: dos Anjos vs. Alvarez.

The event marked the first time fighters were allowed to weigh in for their bouts in the morning (starting 10 a.m.), rather than the traditional time of 4 p.m. used for public proceedings. They weighed in with a California State Athletic Commission (CSAC) official looking on so they would have less time to be dehydrated after their weight cuts and more time to rehydrate after making weight. They were back on hand to stand on the scale – ceremoniously, for the fans and media – and face off with their opponents. This is part of new measures for fighters' safety, with the CSAC creating new rules that will eventually be adapted to all the other athletic commissions.

During the main card broadcast, the UFC announced that UFC 8 and Ultimate Ultimate 96 tournaments winner Don Frye will be inducted to the UFC's Hall of Fame at the "International Fight Week" in July, one day after UFC 200.

Results

Bonus awards
The following fighters were awarded $50,000 bonuses:
Fight of the Night: Marco Polo Reyes vs. Dong Hyun Ma
Performance of the Night: Michael Bisping and Dan Henderson

Reported payout
The following is the reported payout to the fighters as reported to the California State Athletic Commission. It does not include sponsor money or "locker room" bonuses often given by the UFC and also do not include the UFC's traditional "fight night" bonuses.

Michael Bisping: $250,000 (no win bonus) def. Luke Rockhold: $250,000
Dominick Cruz: $350,000 (no win bonus) def. Urijah Faber: $160,000
Max Holloway: $150,000 ($75,000 win bonus) def. Ricardo Lamas: $53,000
Dan Henderson: $800,000 ($200,000 win bonus) def. Hector Lombard: $53,000
Dustin Poirier: $110,000 ($55,000 win bonus) def. Bobby Green: $24,000
Brian Ortega: $46,000 ($23,000 win bonus) def. Clay Guida: $55,000
Beneil Dariush: $62,000 ($31,000 win bonus) vs. James Vick: $23,000 
Jéssica Andrade: $40,000 ($20,000 win bonus) def. Jessica Penne: $20,000
Alex Caceres: $48,000 ($24,000 win bonus) def. Cole Miller: $33,000
Sean Strickland: $46,000 ($23,000 win bonus) def. Tom Breese: $19,000
Luis Henrique da Silva: $20,000 ($10,000 win bonus) def. Jonathan Wilson: $12,000
Kevin Casey: $15,000 vs. Elvis Mutapcic: $16,000 ^
Polo Reyes: $24,000 ($12,000 win bonus) def. Dong Hyun Ma: $10,000

^ Both fighters earned show money; bout declared draw.

See also
List of UFC events
2016 in UFC

References

Ultimate Fighting Championship events
Events in Inglewood, California
Mixed martial arts in California
Mixed martial arts in Los Angeles
Sports competitions in Los Angeles
2016 in mixed martial arts
2016 in sports in California
June 2016 sports events in the United States